Biłgoraj County is a unit of territorial administration and local government (powiat) in Lublin Voivodeship, eastern Poland. It was established on January 1, 1999, as a result of the Polish local government reforms passed in 1998.

As of 2008, its total population is 103,661, which includes 26,306 in Biłgoraj, 3,333 in Tarnogród, 2,486 in Józefów, 1,428 in Frampol, and a rural population of 
67,596.

Neighbouring counties
Biłgoraj County is bordered by Lublin County and Krasnystaw County to the north, Zamość County and Tomaszów Lubelski County to the east, Lubaczów County and Przeworsk County to the south, Leżajsk County to the south-west, Nisko County to the west, and Janów Lubelski County to the north-west.

Administrative division
The county is subdivided into 14 gminas (one urban, three urban-rural and 10 rural). These are listed in the following table, in descending order of population.

References

 
Land counties of Lublin Voivodeship